The 1994 Barking and Dagenham Borough Council election took place on 5 May 1994 to elect members of Barking and Dagenham London Borough Council in London, England. The whole council was up for election and the Labour Party stayed in overall control of the council.

Background
117 candidates nominated in total. Labour again ran a full slate (48) and was the only party to do so, whilst the Liberal Democrats ran 47. By contrast the Conservative Party ran only 12 candidates.

Election result
Labour continued to win a large majority of seats - 44 out of 48. The Residents Association held their 3 seats. The Liberal Democrats won 1 seat.

Ward results

Abbey

Alibon

Becontree

Cambell

Chadwell Heath

Eastbrook

Eastbury

Fanshawe

Gascoigne

Goresbrook

Heath

Longbridge

Manor

Marks Gate

Parsloes

River

Thames

Triptons

Valence

Village

By-elections between 1994 and 1998

Manor

The by-election was called following the resignation of Cllr. Alastair Hannah-Rogers.

Parsloes

The by-election was called following the death of Cllr. Joseph A. Butler.

References

1994
1994 London Borough council elections